Patrick d'Arcy (27 September 1725 – 18 October 1779) was an Irish mathematician born in Kiltullagh, County Galway in the west of Ireland.  His family, who were Catholics, suffered under the penal laws.  In 1739 d'Arcy was sent abroad by his parents to an uncle in Paris. He was tutored in mathematics by Jean-Baptiste Clairaut, and became a friend of Jean-Baptiste's son, Alexis-Claude Clairaut, (Alexis Clairaut), who was a brilliant young mathematician.  d'Arcy made original contributions to dynamics. He is best known for his part in the discovery of the principle of angular momentum, in a form which was known as "the principle of areas," which he announced in 1746.  See the article on areal velocity.  d'Arcy also had an illustrious military career in the French army.  He obtained the title of "Count" in the French nobility. He was a generous patron of Irish refugees in France. In addition to his contributions to dynamics, he performed research on artillery and on electricity. 

An experiment of his, reported in 1765, on visual perception is often referred to: he built a machine in his garden to measure the duration of visual impressions. A burning coal, attached to an arm of a cross rotated by the machine, would be made to spin just fast enough to give the impression of a full fiery circle. With the collaboration of a dedicated observer with better eyesight than D'Arcy, he measured a 0,13 second duration for the visual sensation of the rotating burning coal, as seen in the dark from a circa 50 meter distance. He planned further experiments to measure the suspected differences between individuals, colors, viewing distances and light intensity of objects. The experiment is often mentioned by film scholars in the context of persistence of vision.
 
D'Arcy was elected to the Academie Royale des Sciences in 1749.  He died from cholera in Paris in October 1779.

There is a copy of a portrait of d'Arcy in Wade (1997), which was found in Charbonnier (1928).

References
C.S. Gillmor, "D'Arcy, Patrick," Dictionary of Scientific Biography, Vol. III, pp. 561–2, Scribner's, New York (1970).
http://www.iol.ie/~mfinn/kiltullaghho.html
M. le Chevalier D'Arcy, "Principe Géneral de Dynamique,"Mémoires de l'Académie des Sciences de Paris, 1747, pp. 348–356.   
J. Casey, "Areal Velocity and Angular Momentum for Non-Planar Problems in Particle Mechanics," American Journal of Physics, Vol. 75, pp. 677–685, 2007.

M. le Chevalier D'Arcy, "Sur la Durée de la Sensation de La vue," Mémoires de l'Académie des Sciences de Paris, pp. 439–451, 1765.
N.J. Wade, Guest Editorial, Perception, Vol. 26, 1997, .
P.J. Charbonnier, Essais sur l'Histoire de la Balistique, Société d'Éditions Géographiques, Paris (1928)

 

1725 births
1779 deaths
18th-century Irish people
People from County Galway
Irish physicists
French Army personnel
Deaths from cholera
Irish mathematicians